Ivan Pinheiro Themudo Lessa (May 9, 1935 – June 8, 2012) was a Brazilian journalist and writer of American descent.

Early life
Born in São Paulo, he was the son of the journalist and writer Elsie Lessa and the writer Orígenes Lessa and the father of the British writer Juliana Foster.

Career
Lessa edited and wrote for the newspaper O Pasquim, in which he authored the sections "Gip-Gip-Nheco-Nheco", "Fotonovelas" (Photo-soap-operas) and "Os Diários de Londres" (The London Journals), written in 'partnership' with his heteronym "Edélsio Tavares".

He published three books: Garotos da Fuzarca (Rogue Lads, short stories, 1986), Ivan Vê o Mundo (Ivan Sees the World, 1999) and O Luar e a Rainha (The Moonlight and the Queen, 2005). He also translated Truman Capote's In Cold Blood to Portuguese.

Personal life
For many years Lessa lived in London, where he wrote and broadcast for the Brazilian BBC news website.

Death
Lessa died on June 8, 2012, from pulmonary emphysema in London.

References

1935 births
Brazilian male writers
Brazilian people of American descent
2012 deaths
Deaths from emphysema